Vitamins & Minerals may refer to:

 Vitamins & Minerals (EP), a 2004 EP by Blueprint
 Vitamins & Minerals (journal), an academic journal published by OMICS Publishing Group